José Ramón Andrés Puerta (born 13 July 1969) is a Spanish chef, and founder of World Central Kitchen (WCK), a non-profit devoted to providing meals in the wake of natural disasters. A Spanish-born and raised cook, he is often credited with bringing the small plates dining concept to America. He owns restaurants in Washington, D.C., Los Angeles, Las Vegas, Miami Beach, Orlando, Chicago, and New York City.

He was awarded a 2015 National Humanities Medal at a 2016 White House ceremony for his work with World Central Kitchen. In addition, he has received honorary doctorates from Georgetown University, George Washington University, Harvard University, and Tufts University.

Early life and education 
José Ramón Andrés Puerta was born in Mieres, Asturias, Spain.

Andrés family moved to Catalonia when he was 6. He enrolled in culinary school in Barcelona at the age of 15, and when he needed to complete his Spanish military service at age 18, he was assigned to cook for an admiral. He met Ferran Adrià in Barcelona, and he worked three years at El Bulli, from 1988 to 1990. In December 1990, he was fired by Adrià and decided to move to the United States.

Culinary career

Coming to America
At the age of 21, Andrés arrived in New York City with $50, to cook in midtown Manhattan at an outpost of a popular Spanish restaurant, Eldorado Petit. During his time in New York, he also staged servings at The Quilted Giraffe.

In 1993, he was hired to lead the kitchen at Jaleo, a new tapas restaurant in Washington, D.C. In subsequent years, he helped the owners of Jaleo to open more restaurants: Cafe Atlantico, Zaytinya and Oyamel, along with two more Jaleo outposts.

In 2003, Andrés started minibara restaurant space within a larger restaurantat a six-seat counter within Cafe Atlantico. minibar is devoted to serving the most creative Andrés plates, and reservations would fill up a month in advance.

Celebrity chef and restaurateur
As his restaurants in America enjoyed success, Andrés became more famous in his native Spain, starring in his own cooking show, Vamos a Cocinar, which debuted in 2005. He also published his first book, Tapas: A Taste of Spain in America, in 2005.

In 2006, he partnered with Robert Wilder to form ThinkFoodGroup, making Andrés a co-owner in his restaurants. Together, they opened more restaurants in Miami, Los Angeles, Las Vegas, and Puerto Rico.

Beginning in the fall of 2010, Andrés taught a culinary physics course at Harvard University with Ferran Adrià. In May 2012, Andrés was named dean of Spanish Studies at  The International Culinary Center, where he and Colman Andrews developed a curriculum in traditional and modern Spanish cuisine, which debuted in February 2013. On October 29th, 2012, he announced he was heading back to the classroom, and would teach his first course on how food shapes civilization at George Washington University.

Trump Hotel restaurant and lawsuit
Andrés planned to open a restaurant in the Trump International Hotel in Washington, DC, in 2016. After Donald Trump made disparaging comments about undocumented Mexican immigrants in June 2015, Andrés withdrew from the contract with the Trump Organization, which then sued him. Andrés counter-sued, and the parties reached a settlement in April 2017. Andrés remains an outspoken critic of Trump.

World Central Kitchen 

In response to the 2010 Haiti earthquake, Andrés formed World Central Kitchen, which provides healthy food to families and individuals touched by disasters. Since it was founded, the NGO has organized meals in the Dominican Republic, Nicaragua, Zambia, Peru, Cuba, Uganda, Cambodia, and in Poland on the border of Ukraine. It has provided aid and meals in the United States and Puerto Rico and has helped during the COVID-19 pandemic in the United States.

During the 2022 Russian invasion of Ukraine, José Andrés announced that he was going to donate a part of $100-million Courage and Civility Award given to him by Jeff Bezos to address the humanitarian crisis in Ukraine.

Restaurants 
Along with partner Rob Wilder, Andrés owns several restaurants:

Signature restaurants:

minibar by José Andrés – Washington, DC – several chefs serve a prix fixe menu of about 25 small courses to twelve diners at a time. Received two stars from the DC edition of the Michelin Guide in 2016.
é by José Andrés – Las Vegas – several chefs serve a prix fixe menu of about 25 small courses to nine diners at a time. Modeled after minibar and located inside Jaleo.
The Bazaar by José Andrés – Miami Beach, New York City (opening in 2022) – A combination of traditional Spanish tapas and foods inspired by molecular gastronomy.
Bazaar Meat by José Andrés – Las Vegas, Chicago, and Los Angeles (opening in 2022) – Modern, high-end steakhouse featuring imported cuts of rare meat.

Other restaurants:
Bar Mar by José Andrés – Chicago – Seafood-focused happy hour venue with a raw bar and fancy cocktails.
barmini by José Andrés – Washington, DC – Cocktail bar adjacent to minibar.
Beefsteak – Washington, DC (on campus of George Washington University) and Pittsburgh (inside of the Cohon Center Marketplace at Carnegie Mellon University) – Vegetable-focused fast-casual restaurant.
Butterfly Tacos y Tortas — located inside of Audi Field in Washington, DC — Mexican and Latin fast-casual concept.
Café by the River – Chicago – All-day coffee shop and café.
China Chilcano by José Andrés – Washington, DC – Chinese, Japanese and Peruvian fusion. Included in Michelin Guide's Bib Gourmand list of exceptional restaurants at moderate prices.
China Poblano by José Andrés – Las Vegas – Chinese and Mexican fusion.
Fish by José Andrés – Paradise Island, Bahamas – Fresh Seafood and Bahamian Food
Jaleo by José Andrés – Washington, DC, Orlando (inside of Disney Springs entertainment complex), Las Vegas, Chicago, and Dubai (opening in 2022) – Traditional Spanish tapas. DC location included in Michelin Guide's Bib Gourmand list of exceptional restaurants at moderate prices.
Mercado Little Spain – New York City – Spanish food hall in The Shops & Restaurants at Hudson Yards.
Oyamel – Washington, DC – Small plates and antojitos. Included in Michelin Guide's Bib Gourmand list of exceptional restaurants at moderate prices.
Pepe – Washington, DC (food truck) and Orlando (brick-and-mortar location inside of Disney Springs complex) – Fast-casual Spanish concept featuring sandwiches, salads, gazpacho, and more.
Pigtail by José Andrés – Chicago – Speakeasy-style cocktail bar located in the basement of Jaleo Chicago.
Spanish Diner – Bethesda, Maryland (spin-off of location inside of NYC's Mercado Little Spain) – A Spanish take on the classic American diner.
Zaytinya – Washington, DC and New York City – Small plates of food from the Mediterranean regions of Greece, Turkey, and Lebanon. Included in Michelin Guide's Bib Gourmand list of exceptional restaurants at moderate prices.

Awards and honors 
Awards and prizes
 2003 – Best Chef of the Mid-Atlantic Region, James Beard Foundation
 2010 – Orden de las Artes y las Letras de España – Order of Arts and Letters, Cabinet of Spain
 2010 – Vilcek Prize in Culinary Arts
 2011 – Outstanding Chef, James Beard Foundation
 2015 – National Humanities Medal, National Endowment for the Humanities (NEH), United States government
 2017 – Lifetime Achievement Award, International Association of Culinary Professionals
 2018 – James Beard Foundation Award for Humanitarian of the Year
 2019 – Julia Child Award from The Julia Child Foundation for Gastronomy and the Culinary Arts
 2021 – Princess of Asturias Award in the category "Concord".
2021 – Recipient of second Courage and Civility Award from Jeff Bezos at a press conference following Blue Origin's first human flight (includes  to distribute to non-profit organizations of Andrés' choice)
2022 – Order of Merit (Ukraine), 2nd class

Media honors
 2004 – Saveur 100 List, Saveur
 2004 – Chef of the Year, Bon Appetit
 2009 – Chef of the Year, GQ
 2012 – One of the world's 100 most influential people, Time
 2016 – Michelin Guide Washington, DC, 2 Michelin stars for minibar by José Andrés
 2018 – One of the world's 100 most influential people, Time

Honorary degrees
 Andrés received in May 2014, an honorary doctorate degree in public service from George Washington University, and served as the university's commencement speaker at the National Mall the same year.
 In May 2018, Andrés received an honorary Doctor of Public Service degree from Tufts University and served as the commencement speaker for the Gerald J. and Dorothy R. Friedman School of Nutrition Science and Policy at Tufts University.
 In 2019, Andrés received an honorary degree from Georgetown University.
 In May 2022, Andrés received an honorary degree from Harvard University.

Nominations
 In 2015, Andrés was appointed by President Barack Obama as an ambassador for citizenship and naturalization.
 In 2018, Andrés was named a Nobel Peace Prize nominee for his humanitarian work.

Personal life 
Andrés is married to Patricia "Tichi" Fernández de la Cruz and has three daughters; they live in Bethesda, Maryland, United States. He met his wife while they were both living in Washington, DC; she is originally from Cadiz, Andalucía
in the southwest of Spain.

He became a naturalized U.S. citizen in December 2013.

Filmography

Bibliography 

  – a book based on his Spanish cooking show Vamos a cocinar.
 
  – a cookbook on tapas and Spanish cuisine
 –  after Hurricane Maria in 2017, Chef José Andrés had a "crazy dream" to feed Puerto Rico.
Andrés, José; Goulding, Matt (2019). Vegetables Unleashed—A Cookbook. Anthony Bourdain/Ecco. .

See also 
 Mediterranean cuisine

References

External links 

 joseandres.com
 ThinkFoodGroup, the home page for the ventures of José Andrés
 
 

American male chefs
Chefs from Washington, D.C.
American people of Asturian descent
Spanish chefs
Spanish television chefs
American humanitarians
Harvard University faculty
George Washington University faculty
Order of Arts and Letters of Spain recipients
Spanish emigrants to the United States
People from Mieres, Asturias
1969 births
Living people
Naturalized citizens of the United States
James Beard Foundation Award winners
Head chefs of Michelin starred restaurants
American television chefs
American cookbook writers
21st-century American non-fiction writers
National Humanities Medal recipients